The Torre dei Conti is a medieval fortified tower in Rome, Italy, located near the Colosseum and the Roman Forum. The tower was one of the most impressive towers that dominated medieval Rome.

History
It was built in 1238 by Richard Conti, brother of Pope Innocent III as a fortified residence for his family, the Conti di Segni, over one of the exedra of the portico of the four apses of the Imperial fora (The Temple of Peace) near the Forum of Nerva. The tower stood on the border of the territory of the rival family of the Frangipani.
Originally covered in travertine salvaged from the ruins of the Imperial Fora, this covering was in turn stripped for use in the construction of the Porta Pia in the 16th century, designed by Michelangelo.

The upper floors were destroyed by a series of earthquakes culminating in the earthquake of 1348, after which it was abandoned until 1620, when it was rebuilt by the Papal Chamber. Other earthquakes in 1630 and 1644 caused damage which was repaired at the end of the 17th century by Pope Alexander VIII, who added two buttresses.

With the opening of the Via Cavour in the 19th century and the Via dei Fori Imperiali in the early 20th century, the tower was left isolated from other buildings. In 1937, the tower was donated by Benito Mussolini to the Arditi (Italian stormtroopers), which retained ownership until 1943. The tower contains the mausoleum of General Alessandro Parisi, whose remains are preserved in an ancient Roman sarcophagus. Parisi, who died in an automobile accident in 1938, was the leader of the Arditi.

See also
Torre delle Milizie

Sources

External links

Buildings and structures completed in 1237
Towers completed in the 13th century
Conti
Rome R. I Monti